Kshanbhar Vishraanti is a Marathi film released on 9 April 2010. The movie has been produced by Sandeep S. Shinde along with Maulik Bhatt and directed by Sachit Patil.

Cast 

 Bharat Jadhav as Appa; Neha's uncle, Jiji's brother.
 Sachit Patil as Ritvik.
 Sonalee Kulkarni as Sanika.
 Siddarth Jadhav as Vishnu Pant Jagdale.
 Manava Naik as Neha.
 Hemant Dhome as Abhijeet.
 Kadambari Kadam as Manasi.
 Maulik Bhatt as Rahul.
 Pooja Sawant as Nishita.
 Shubhangi Gokhale as Jiji.
 Jayraj Nair as Mhatre; broker.

Soundtracks
The music was composed by Hrishikesh Kamerkar. Lyrics are penned by Guru Thakur.

References

External links 
 Official Facebook Page - facebook.com
 
 Movie Review - movies.burrp.com

2010 films
2010s Marathi-language films